John Rambo (born 1661 in Philadelphia, Pennsylvania – died October 17, 1741 in Gloucester County, New Jersey) was a judge and elected official in colonial New Jersey.

He was the youngest of eight children born to a Swedish immigrant family. Rambo's father, Peter Gunnarsson Rambo (1612–1698), was one of the first colonists in the Swedish colony of New Sweden. John Rambo was a judge in Gloucester County court from 1695 to 1697. He was also one of the first Swedish Americans to be elected to the council of New Jersey (1697–1701). In 1685 Rambo married Brigitta Cock (1665–1726), the daughter of Peter Larsson Cock (1610–1687) who a justice of the New Sweden court. Rambo and his wife had 11 children.

References

Other sources 
 Beatty, Ronald Rambo Family Tree (AuthorHouse; 2 edition. 2008)

1661 births
1741 deaths
Politicians from Philadelphia
American people of Swedish descent
Members of the New Jersey Provincial Council
People of New Sweden
People from Gloucester County, New Jersey
People of colonial Pennsylvania
People of colonial New Jersey